Parnassia californica is a species of flowering plant in the family Celastraceae known by the common name California grass of Parnassus. It is native to the mountains of Oregon, California, and Nevada, where it grows in moist areas such as meadows and streambanks.

It is a perennial herb producing an erect flowering stem from a patch of basal leaves. The leaf is up to 14 centimeters long with an oval or spoon-shaped blade at the end of a long petiole. The inflorescence may be nearly half a meter tall and consists of a mostly naked peduncle with one bract midway up.

The single flower has five small sepals behind five veined white petals each 1 to 2 centimeters long. At the center of the flower are five stamens and five staminodes with fringes of many hairlike, sphere-tipped lobes.

External links
Jepson Manual Treatment
Photo gallery

californica
Flora of California
Flora of Nevada
Flora of Oregon
Flora of the Sierra Nevada (United States)
Taxa named by Asa Gray
Taxa named by Edward Lee Greene
Flora without expected TNC conservation status